Adam Krug is an American ice hockey coach and former player who was the NCAA Division III coach of the year in 2022.

Career
Krug's college career began at Wayne State in 2004. After leading the team in scoring as a sophomore, rumors began to circulate about financial troubles with the program. Krug transferred to Adrian College, a small school in southern Michigan, who were set to begin playing varsity ice hockey in 2007. He debuted for the Division III team that year and went on to lead the Bulldogs in scoring, averaging more than 2 points a game. His exploits helped the club win their conference title, however, because the MCHA did not have an automatic bid at the time the Bulldogs weren't invited to play in the NCAA tournament. Krug led his team to a repeat performance in his final season, posing a record of 27–1–1, but were again left out of the tournament.

After graduating, Krug had a short career as a professional. Over a 5-year span he played sparing at most of his stops, however, he did have one good season with the Nijmegen Devils where he led the club in scoring. After playing just one game in 2012–13, Krug retired as a player and began his coaching career.

Krug's first job was as an assistant with the Indiana Ice. In his second season with the team, he helped lead them to a Clark Cup championship, but the financial situation forced the team to suspend operations after the year. Krug was not without a job for long, however, because in the same offseason his former bench boss, Ron Fogarty accepted the head coaching position at Princeton. Adrian turned to one of their own as a replacement and Krug was named as the second head coach for the Bulldogs.

in six seasons under Fogarty, Adrian had never finished with fewer than 20 wins and posted a winging percentage of at least .700. Very little changed when Krug took over as the Bulldogs, who were now in the NCHA, continued to be one of the top teams in Division III. In his first four seasons, Krug won four conference titles, two conference tournament titles and made two appearances in the Frozen Four. After a slight down season in 2019, Adrian returned to the top of their conference in 2020 only to see the team's tournament hopes ended by the COVID-19 pandemic. After slogging through the tumultuous 2021 season, the Bulldogs returned in force for 2022. Adrian posted one of the best records in history, going 31–1, being the unanimous #1 team, and blowing through all three opponents in the tournament en route to the program's first national championship. For the outstanding performance by his team, Krug also received the Edward Jeremiah Award.

Personal life
Two of Adam's brothers played college hockey. He played with middle brother Matt at Wayne State while the younger Torey attended Michigan State before embarking on a long career in the NHL.

Statistics

Regular season and playoffs

Head coaching record

References

External links

1983 births
American ice hockey coaches
American men's ice hockey players
Living people
Ice hockey people from Michigan
People from Livonia, Michigan
Adrian College alumni
Adrian College faculty
Sioux City Musketeers players
Wayne State Warriors men's ice hockey players
Cincinnati Cyclones players
Bossier-Shreveport Mudbugs players
Nijmegen Devils players
Mississippi Surge players
Toledo Walleye players
Steaua Rangers players
Evansville IceMen players